Necrophobia is a specific phobia, the irrational fear of dead organisms (e.g., corpses) as well as things associated with death (e.g., coffins, tombstones, funerals, cemeteries). With all types of emotions, obsession with death becomes evident in both fascination and objectification. In a cultural sense, necrophobia may also be used to mean a fear of the dead by a cultural group, e.g., a belief that the spirits of the dead will return to haunt the living.

The sufferer may experience this sensation all the time, or when something triggers the fear, like a close encounter with a dead animal or the funeral of a loved one or friend. The word necrophobia is derived from the Greek nekros (νεκρός) for "corpse" and the Greek phobos (φόβος) for "fear".

See also
List of phobias
Thanatophobia

References

Phobias
Thanatos